The Mercedes-Benz W210 was the internal designation for a range of executive cars manufactured by Mercedes-Benz and marketed under the E-Class model name in both sedan/saloon (1995–2002) and station wagon/estate (1996–2003) configurations. W210 development started in 1988, three years after the W124's introduction.

The W210 was designed by Steve Mattin under design chief Bruno Sacco between 1988 and 1991 later being previewed on the 1993 Coupé Concept shown at the Geneva Auto Show in March 1993. The W210 was the first Mercedes-Benz production car featuring Xenon headlamps (including dynamic headlamp range control, only low beam).

Design patent and facelift
Design patents for both the Coupé Concept and the W210 E-Class were filed on 25 February 1993 in Germany and 25 August 1993 in the US. 
On 21 July 1998, design patents were filed on an updated W210 (designed in 1997).

For model year 2000, a multi-function information system was incorporated into the instrument cluster below the speedometer, and the introduction of steering wheel controls for the audio/navigation/phone system. In addition, the 5-speed automatic transmission introduced  +/- gate positions for semi-manual control of the gearbox, marketed as "Touch Shift." This electronic system replaced the previous gated shift arrangement. Exterior changes included a revised front with a steeper rake, similar to the CLK, and restyled bumpers and lower body trim. Sedans received new taillights, and the wagon's tailgate was revised, moving the CHMSL from the base of the rear window to directly above it. The final W210 production included the E 320 and E 430 special editions released in two exterior colors - quartz silver (limited edition), obsidian black, and with Xenon lights, 17-inch alloy wheels and black maple walnut trim. Estate cars (sedans optionally) had Citroën-like self-leveling rear suspension with suspension struts rather than shock absorbers, gas-filled suspension spheres to provide damping and an under bonnet pressurizing pump. Unlike the traditional Citroën application Mercedes opted for a fixed ride height and employed rear coil springs to maintain the static ride height when parked.

Engines 

This was the first time a V6 engine was offered (model year 1998) to replace the straight-six configuration (1995–1997). In North America, the range also features two diesels, including both non-turbocharged (1996–1997) and turbocharged (1998–1999) 3.0 litre straight-six units. In 1999, Mercedes-Benz discontinued diesel powerplants in the E-class in North America. In Europe, the diesel engines were superseded by more advanced Common Rail (CDI) units (2000–2002). The CDI engines were not offered in North America until the E 320 CDI in the newer W211 model.

1Electronically limited

2Sold only in Greece, Italy, Portugal, Turkey, Bulgaria, Croatia, Macedonia and Hungary

4Sold only in Portugal

5A  version with biodiesel-compatibility is available for fleet sales

7Sold only in Italy

Transmissions 

The W210 E-Class carried over the 4-speed 722.4 and 722.3 automatic transmissions along with the optional 722.5 5-speed, all from the previous generation W124 E-Class. For the 1997 model year, Mercedes-Benz installed an electronically controlled, new-generation automatic gearbox (NAG): the 722.6 5-speed automatic transmission to replace the previous transmissions.

A five-speed manual was also available, although after the facelift for the 2000 model year, it was replaced by a six-speed manual. The 5-speed transmission was marketed as "sealed for life"; however, Mercedes-Benz dealers now recommend changing the fluid at regular intervals.

Wheels 
The W210 chassis originally came with one of the following OEM wheel setups:
 E 200/E 220 CDI/E 230/E 240 (pre-facelift)/E 300 diesel: 15 x 6.5" ET37
 E 200 Kompressor/E 240/E 280/E 320/E 420: 16 x 7.5" ET41
 E 430: 16 x 7.5" ET41 (before 2000); 17 x 7.5" ET41 (after 2000)
 Sport Package: 17 x 8" ET37
 Special Edition: 17 x 8" ET35
 E 55 AMG: 18 x 8" ET31 front, 18 x 9" ET35 rear.
ET is the German abbreviation for Einpresstiefe or offset, where the number is in mm and indicates the amount of offset. This ETxx is stamped on the inside of OEM rims for easy reference.

The bolt pattern is 5x112 (12 mm x 1.5 lugs), with an offset range of 30–40 mm, a wheel size range of 16"x6.0" to 20"x8.5". This is the same bolt pattern as most Mercedes, including the previous E-Class (W124). The newer Mercedes, including the 2003 (W211) to the present E-Class (W213), have 14 mm ball seats, making the wheels interchangeable only with the use of aftermarket lugs that combine a 14 mm ball seat (also known as "R14", the "R" meaning radius) with a 12 mm thread.

AMG versions 

There were four engines that AMG installed in the W210. The first was the E 36, M104.995, launched in 1996 for select markets then the M119.980 in the E 50 AMG produced from early 1996 until late 1997. This model was assembled in Affalterbach under the one man one engine philosophy, only available in left hand drive European markets although many were exported to Japan from new. It is estimated around 2,800 E 50's were ever produced in its limited production run. There was also an option for the M119.980 V8 that was bored out to 6.0L and increased power to  the cars these were fitted to were designated as the E 60 and came in sedan and wagon varieties.

The body styling on all of the W210 AMG models was the same until 2000 when a facelift and interior upgrades were implemented. The W210 E 55 was the last vehicle for which a major portion of production took place at AMG in Affalterbach. Production was actually split between Affalterbach and the Bremen Mercedes-Benz facility until the end of 2001.

E 36 AMG 

The rarest of the W210 AMG models due to low productions numbers is the European-spec E 36. Based on the E 280, it was only produced in 1996 and 1997 and was not available in the US market. In Australia, they cost upwards of AUD $185,000 (new) and there were only 49 units sold. While rare, they are nowhere near as powerful as the V8-engined AMG cars.

Production Figures: <400 (production models).

Performance
 0–: 6.7 s (AMG figure)
 Top speed:  (Electronically limited)

The E 36 looks identical to the E 55 (pre-facelift).

E 50 AMG 

The European-spec E 50 was only produced in 1996–1997. The E 50 was not available on the US market. This model is becoming very desirable for collectors due to its rarity.

Production Figures: ~2,870 (production models).
 Chassis 210.072
 Motor M 119.985
 Transmission 722.6xx

Engine
 90° V8, high-pressure die-cast alloy block, alloy heads
 Displacement 5.0 L (6.0)
 Bore 
 Stroke 
 Compression ratio: 11.2:1 (same)
 Output  at 5550 rpm
 Torque  at 3200 - 4400 rpm
 Valve Gear double roller chain-driven DOHC, 4 valves per cylinder.
 Redline 6000 rpm Distributor-less computer controlled ignition. Electronic Fuel Injection (Bosch LH Jetronic)
(Same engine used in the S500/C, SL500, with tuned exhaust and cylinder head)

Transmission
 5 and 6 speed (optional) auto 722.609 (same as C43, E 55, SL/S 600/c)
 Final drive ratio 3.06
 1st gear 3.59
 2nd gear 2.19
 3rd gear 1.41
 4th gear 1.00
 5th gear 0.83
 Reverse gear R1 3.16
 Reverse gear R2 1.90 (Winter mode)

Performance
 General consensus 0-60 mph / 0–100 km/h ~6 seconds
 0–: 6.2 s (AMG figure)
 0–: 5.8 s (Auto Motor und Sport 9/96)
 Top speed:  (Drag limited)

The 1998 and 1999 E 55 are identical to the E 50 (pre-facelift).

1998 E 55 AMG 
The W210 E 55 was produced for 5 years 1998 through 2002 with a facelift in 2000. Production figures. ~12,000 accounted for (production models). 3000 per year. 500 per year imported into North America.
 Chassis: 210.074
 Motor: M 113.980
 Transmission: 722.622

Engine
 90 degree V-8, high-pressure die-cast alloy block, alloy heads
 Displacement 5.4 L
 Bore 
 Stroke 
 Compression ratio 10.5:1
 Output  at 5550 rpm
 Torque  at 3150 - 4500 rpm
 Valve Gear chain-driven SOHC, 3 valves per cylinder.
 Redline 6,000 rpm

Transmission
 5 speed auto 722.6 (same as W203 C55, E 55, SL/S 600/c)
 Final drive ratio 2.82
 1st gear 3.59
 2nd gear 2.19
 3rd gear 1.41
 4th gear 1.00
 5th gear 0.83
 Reverse gear R1 3.16
 Reverse gear R2 1.90 (Winter mode)

Performance
 General Consensus 0-62 mph - 0–100 km/h 5.4 s
 0-: 5,4 s AMG figure (1999)
 Station Wagon (T-modell): 5,7 s
 0-: 5,3 s (Auto Motor und Sport 7/98)
 Top speed:  Electronically limited.

2001 E 55 AMG 

The 2001 model year E 55 was a rare version of the W210 E 55 AMG, of which only 653 units were produced in 2001.

Common items were AMG exclusive "Condor" leather, black birdseye maple interior wood trim, AMG monoblock staggered 18-inch wheels and tires, AMG sport suspension, AMG brakes, AMG/Avantgarde front and rear body aprons with "dynamic" side skirts, AMG body shell modification, HID xenon headlights, Avantgarde fog lamps, heated multicontour AMG sport seats with power and memory, multifunction computer, automatic climate control system, Bose premium sound system, power tilt and telescoping leather-covered AMG multifunction sport steering wheel, power glass sunroof, power rear sun shade, and blue glass. Most of these items were standard in North America.

E 50, E 60 and E 55 AMG - common technical specifications 

Suspension
 Front Independent double wishbone with coil springs, gas-pressurized shock absorbers and stabilizer bar.
 Rear 5-arm multilink with coil springs, gas-pressurized shock absorbers and stabilizer bar.
After model year 2000 Bilstein gas shock absorbers and progressive-rate springs were added with larger, solid stabilizer bars.

Brakes
Hydraulic dual-circuit braking system with vacuum servo unit, disk brakes, internally ventilated, two piece front "floating" rotors and 2-piston front floating calipers.

Steering
 Type Rack-and-pinion with speed-sensitive power assist and integrated hydraulic damper.
 turns lock-to-lock 3.20
 turning circle curb-to-curb 

Wheels and tires (tyres)
 Wheel Size (front) 8.0J x 18 in
 Wheel Size (rear) 9.0J x 18 in
 Wheel Type Aluminum Alloy AMG II Monoblock
 Tires 235/40ZR18 front, 265/35ZR18 rear

Dimensions and weight
 Wheelbase 111.5 in/2,833 mm
 Front track 61.4 in/1,560 mm
 Rear Track 60.8 in/1,543 mm
 Length 189.4 in/4,810 mm
 Width 70.8 in/1,799 mm
 Height 56.9 in/1,445 mm
 Curb Weight 3,768 lb/1,715 kg
 Coefficient of drag: 0.29 Cd
 Power-to-weight ratio: 0.09

Options available

Power adjustable front seats, power tilt & telescoping leather-covered AMG sport steering wheel, leather upholstery, leather shift knob, 5 speed automatic transmission, Brake Assist System (BAS), Electronic Stability System (ESP), automatic climate control with charcoal filter, heated front seats, heated rear seats (European models), front and side airbags, power windows, metallic paint, xenon HID headlamps. Most of the options were standard in North America. Rare options were parktronic (sonar parking sensors on front and rear bumpers), COMAND navigation 2000-2002 (CD based map) with integrated single CD player AM/FM/Weather band in dash radio with steering mounted controls, remote trunk mounted 6 disk CD player, Mercedes Tele-Aid satellite/cellular communication (2000-2002) cooled/heated vented seats, voice control radio/navigation and built in cellular telephone.
E55 Wagon (Estate) not offered to North American market.

GUARD versions 
The W210 was the first E-Class available with factory armoring, these cars were known as GUARD versions and were available with 2 different levels of armored protection, B4 or B6.

The E 320 and E 430 were offered with B4 armoring and the E 430 and E 420 with B6.

Features of Guard include:

- ISOCLIMA bullet proof glass.

- no sunroof

- driver's glass with partial opening, all other windows are fixed

- Full reinforced structure and suspension to hold extra weight

- SLS (self leveling rear suspension)

- Microphone with external speaker (optional)

- Users manual includes a Special Protected Vehicles B4/B6 booklet.

- Datacard codes for GUARD lists 979 - Safety Version added with Z04 - B4 Reinforcement on Special Protection Version or Z06 - B6 Reinforcement on Special Protection Version.

4MATIC all-wheel drive option 

In 1997, Mercedes-Benz reintroduced the 4MATIC all-wheel drive system in the US on the W210, although it was previously available in some European territories. Although this 4Matic system shares its name with the 90's 4MATIC system of the W124 300E, the system was totally redesigned and simplified. Rather than using the clutches and couplings of the earlier design, Mercedes opted to use three open differentials: front, center, and rear. The front suspension design of the 4MATIC-equipped models is different from the rear wheel drive models and makes some replacement parts (such as shock absorbers) more expensive.

The E 55 AMG was available on request with 4MATIC option, based on the driveline of the E 430.

Reliability concerns 
Some known problems include the front spring perch being corroded and tearing away from the inner fender (wing), causing the front suspension to collapse. (4Matic models are not believed to be affected.) Other problems include defective harmonic balancer pulleys (recall), rust on trunk lid near latch, rust on Mercedes emblem on front hood, rust on door frames under window seals (recall), rust on front wings just above bumper, defective mass airflow meter, melted rear light bulb sockets, defective blower motor regulators, and rear window regulator failures.

Harmonic Balancer - Some M112 and M113 engines used in W210 models were equipped with a harmonic balancer pulley which, due to a supplier quality problem, may fail and cause engine damage. If the rubber insert of the harmonic balancer pulley delaminates, the pulley may grind through the timing chain cover and oil pan, causing several thousand dollars of damage. Mercedes-Benz USA issued Service Campaign #2005-020003 which included inspection of the part and replacement if necessary at no cost. The part number on the harmonic balancer pulley can be compared to those given to Mercedes-Benz dealers in the Service Campaign notice to determine if the part is a faulty original or has been replaced with the updated part. Replacement of the faulty part with the updated part should be a permanent solution to this problem.

Blower Motor Regulator - If this part fails, the climate control fan will not operate faster than approximately 50% power. Mercedes updated the regulator to improve its reliability, but the redesigned regulator requires the installation of a new blower motor. The old-style regulator, which is compatible with the existing blower motor, is no longer manufactured. The blower motor regulator may be replaced with the much less expensive W140 S-class blower regulator, provided that the E-class wiring harness is re-attached to the S-class regulator.

Front Sway Bar Drop Links - While not a serious concern, most E-classes end up with a sub  clicking or rattling sound from the front end. This is usually due to worn out front-end sway-bar drop links. These can easily be replaced by anybody with minor knowledge of vehicle DIY, for no more than around £20.

Front Spring Perches - Some owners have reported rust problems on the front spring perches - the top perches, which hold the tops of the springs for the front suspension. The perches are spot welded to the chassis, and factory coated in a weatherproof mastic to stop their rusting, however in some rare occurrences, water gets behind the mastic causing the perches to rust and eventually to fail - leading to collapse of the suspension. The car remains controllable. This is a problem that Mercedes USA have acknowledged. The problem is not identifiable without first removing the mastic to check.

Body corrosion - Most model year versions of the W210 displayed body rust, notably on European-sold cars. Rust would sometimes appear spontaneously on panels such as doors and roofs on cars less than a year old. In response to this problem, the manufacturer would in some cases change or repair the affected panels under warranty or good will. Mercedes-Benz has been criticized in the European press for not officially acknowledging this problem. This was due to problems introducing water-based paint technology within the German automobile industry, between the years 1998–2002.

Window regulators - The power window regulator, essentially the mechanism that transfers power from the electric motor to the window, has a few plastic parts that can fail after several years causing the power window to stop operating.

Cylinder Head Gasket - The cylinder head gasket on the M104 is known to fail, causing an oil leak at the rear of the cylinder head.

Differential Bushing - The rear IRS differential bushing wears rapidly during high performance driving and cornering.

Diesel injection distributor pump - The OM604 engines (E 200D and E 220D) were equipped with an electronically controlled injection pump from Lucas. The seals of the Lucas injection pumps become brittle over time and leak. The electromechanics have also been known to fail. Since the replacement of the entire injection pump is very expensive, a repair kit is offered in which the affected seals are replaced. Failed Lucas pumps are also commonly replaced with Bosch pumps from W124.

Model lineage 
The W210 models replaced the W124 E-Class models after 1995, launching in mainland Europe in September 1995 and in the United States on 8 November 1995. W210 sedans were replaced by the W211 E-Class after 2002, and wagons/estates changed body style to the W211 after 2003.

References

External links 
 EclassBenz.com
 MBWorld.org W210 E-class Forum
 Benzworld.org W210 E-class Forum
 UK MBClub Forum

W210
W210
Executive cars
Euro NCAP executive cars
Cars introduced in 1995
2000s cars
Limousines